Armin Andreas Pangerl (born 13 May 1965 in Bayreuth) is a German painter, author and exhibition maker.

Life 
Pangerl was born 1965 as Son of police officer Anton Pangerl and his wife Monika. He has three brothers and grew up in Bayreuth, Lörrach und Lahr/Schwarzwald.

He lives and works in Lahr.

Style and works 

Armin Andreas Pangerl has been primarily self-taught in abstract painting since he was a child. In addition, since a stay in psychiatry, he has been painting conceptually and in the outsider art manner. Series and series of images are often created that are thematically the same. However, he rejects repetitions in his motifs except for the "one million project". So far, around 400,000 crosses (ink brushes) have been painted on 53 pictures. In addition to this main work, around 800 works on paper were created.
In addition, his sketches and drawings form a controversial universe of thoughts and transitions in the image formulations. The absurd has the same priority as the banal. Text passages and fragments of thought are often built into the form of associations to the painted that reflect the present. Another engine is music. Pangerl taught himself to play the guitar and piano at the age of 13, and there was an early ability to create his own compositions.

In 2017, some of his works were included in the Prinzhorn Collection in Heidelberg.

His texts are written in the first person perspective and convey an impression of the current inner state of mind.

Exhibitions (selection) 
 1992: Gruppenausstellung Offenburg Spitalspeicher
 1999: Solo Exhibition Landratsamt Lahr (PB)
 2000: Group Exhibition Medienhaus Lahr
 2000: Solo Exhibition im Dienstzimmer des Oberbürgermeisters von Lahr
 2004: Solo Exhibition: one million& verortung, Kunsthalle Altdorf
 2004: Solo Exhibition: "Flurgestaltung" Kreishaus Lahr
 2007: Ausstellung im Industriemuseum Oberhausen (Zinkfabrik Altenberg) aus Anlass des Dienstleistungswettbewerbs des Wirtschaftsministerium NRW
 2011/2012: „Grenzgänger“ Lahr, Florenz, Freiburg, Zürich, Berlin. Museum für Kommunikation Berlin, Charity Summit 12 Berlin
 2017: Aufnahme in die Sammlung Freundeskreis Willy-Brandt-Haus Berlin
 2018: Textbeitrag zum Kunstpreis "so gesehen"
 2019: Aufnahme in Museum im Lagerhaus St. Gallen Schweiz
 2019: Aufnahme eines weiteren Werkes in die Sammlung Prinzhorn, Heidelberg
 2020: Aufnahme in die Galerie Henry Boxer (Richmond)
 2020: Aufnahme in die Galerie Henry Boxer (Richmond)
 2020: Collection Peter Bolliger (Zürich)
 2020: Collection Peter Bolliger (Zürich)
 2021: Collection Turhan Demirel (Wuppertal)
 2021: Collection Eckhard Busch (Köln)
 2022: Collection Dominique Peloux-Raynal (Frankreich)

Publications

Movies 
 2007: Outsider Art Markt Colletion Prinzhorn, Heidelberg

Memberships 
Armin Andreas Pangerl is a founding member and honorary member of the association "Die Brücke" (The Bridge) e.V. Aidgroup for People in mental distress. He is also a member of Art-Transmitter.de and Insiderart.de as well Saatchi Art online and the European Outsider Art Association (EOA).

Awards and honours 
 Nomination IBK Preis 2005 mit dem Atelier Projekt
 Honorary Membership in the Die Brücke e.V. (25 Jahre)

References

External links 
 
 Website
 Armin Andreas Pangerl (Atelier Lahr)
 
 wikiart.org

1965 births
Living people
German male painters
German male writers
Outsider artists